Prawit Wongsuwan (born 11 August 1945) is a Thai politician who is serving as  the First Deputy Prime Minister and previously served as Minister of Defence from 2008 to 2011 during the government of Prime Minister Abhisit Vejjajiwa and from 2014 to 2019 in the first government of Prime Minister Prayut Chan-ocha. He also previously served as the deputy chairman of the National Council for Peace and Order (NCPO), a military junta which ruled Thailand from 2014 to 2019. From 2004 to 2005 he was the commander-in-chief of the Royal Thai Army (RTA). In 2022, he briefly became Acting Prime Minister of Thailand after Prayut was briefly suspended from carrying out his duties as Prime Minister of Thailand by the Constitutional Court of Thailand after the court agreed to take up the case on whether Prayut had exceeded the constitutional term limit for the office of Prime Minister. The Constititutional Court of Thailand later ruled on 30 September 2022 that Prayut had not exceeded his term limit and may continue to serve as Prime Minister. Prayut was thereafter able to resume carrying out duties as Prime Minister as a result of the court ruling and Prawit ceased to become the Acting Prime Minister of Thailand on the same date of the court ruling.

Life and career 

Prawit's father was Major General Prasert Wongsuwan. He has four younger brothers: the Senator Admiral Sithawat Wongsuwan; Police General Patcharawat Wongsuwan (the former Commissioner-General of the Royal Thai Police); former jewelry and watch repair technician, deceased football manager Pongphan Wongsuwan; and Phanpong Wongsuwan.

Prawit attended Saint Gabriel's College and Armed Forces Academies Preparatory School (class 6, graduated 1965). After graduating from Chulachomklao Royal Military Academy (class 17) in 1969, he became an officer in the 21st Infantry Regiment (Queen's Guard), 2nd Infantry Division. In 1978, he completed the Thai Command and General Staff course. After a failed coup in April 1981, he led in turn both the 2nd and 12th regiments of the 2nd Inf Div. In 1992, he was appointed royal aide-de-camp. In 1996 he was promoted to commander of the 2nd Infantry Division. After graduating from the National Defence College of Thailand in 1997, he became deputy commander, and in 1998 commander of the 1st Army Region (responsible for Bangkok and central Thailand). In 2001, he was appointed assistant chief-of-staff responsible for the army's operative branch. He returned to command the 1st Army Region, before being promoted to deputy commander-in-chief of the army in 2003 and commander-in-chief in 2004. After retiring from active military service, he became a judge at the supreme courts-martial. After the 2006 coup d'état, he was appointed a member of the National Legislative Assembly.

In December 2008 Prawit was appointed minister of defence in Abhisit Vejjajiva's cabinet, serving until August 2011. During the 2010 Thai political protests to which the government reacted with declaring a state of emergency and finally a military crackdown, Prawit was the deputy director, after 5 October 2010 director of the Centre for the Resolution of the Emergency Situation.

Prawit is known as the mentor (or "big brother") of a military clique called the "Burapha Payak (tigers of the east)", who typically start their careers in the 21st Infantry Regiment (nicknamed the "Queen's Tigers") based in Prachinburi in eastern Thailand. This group includes former Commander-in-Chief Anupong Paochinda, and his successor Prayut Chan-o-cha. Kasit Piromya, a former Democrat Party MP who served as foreign minister from 2008 to 2011, said that throughout his career, Prawit has mentored Prayut, helping him climb up the ranks. "Prawit was like a big brother," Kasit said.  Prawit is often considered a backer of the anti-government protests during the 2013–14 Thai political crisis, cited as a potential leader in coup rumors (which he denied), or as a possible candidate for prime minister in the event that the anti-government movement should succeed.

2014 coup d'état

According to Paul Sanderson, writing for New Mandala, Prawit is "widely considered the architect of the 2014 coup".

After the 22 May 2014 coup d'état, the junta appointed Prawit chairman of its "advisory board". On 31 August 2014 he was appointed deputy prime minister and minister of defence in Prayut's cabinet. On 16 September he was also appointed deputy chairman of the National Council for Peace and Order (NCPO). In his multiple roles, Prawit sits on "...more than 50 committees".

Corruption scandal
In December 2017 the National Anti-corruption Commission (NACC) opened an investigation into Prawit's asset disclosures. The NACC gave Prawit until 8 January 2018 to clarify why some Prawit assets, such as the 18 luxury watches that had been identified at the time, were not listed on his mandatory asset declarations when he took office after the 2014 coup d'etat. As more watch disclosures became public, the NACC extended Prawit's deadline to 19 January. On 29 December, Worawit Sukboon, secretary general of the NACC said, "We will investigate this case. It won't take a long time because it's not complicated." By law, political office-holders as well as high-ranking officials must report their assets before assuming their posts and after they leave the posts. They are not required to declare assets while in office. He is said to have filed asset declarations on 22 December 2008 when he became defence minister under Abhisit Vejjajiva; on 10 August 2011 when stepping down from that role; on 9 August 2012, one year after stepping down from his previous role; and on 4 September 2014 when he became deputy prime minister and defence minister. On 6 January the Bangkok Post estimated the value of Prawit's 16 then-known timepieces at "...up to 22M[illion baht]" (US$685,000). Since 6 January an additional nine watches have been identified by the Facebook site, CSI_LA, bringing Prawit's total to 25 timepieces, altogether worth almost 40 million baht. Prawit claims they were all loaned to him by friends.
On 9 January 2018, NACC president, Pol Gen Watcharapol Prasarnrajkit, announced he had taken personal charge of the Prawit watch investigation. He promised a "...'professional, transparent' [inquiry], although it will take some time." NACC secretary-general Worawit Sukboon asked the media not to ask about the matter again until "early next month" (February 2018).

The Association to Protect the Thai Constitution, a watchdog group, petitioned the NACC to investigate Prawit for possible false declaration of assets and concealing information that must be declared to the agency. The organisation also accused Prawit of being unusually wealthy under Section 66 of the National Anti-Corruption Act. "Gen Prawit served in the army for about 40 years and was a political office holder for two terms, without any businesses. He could not possibly acquire such a great deal of wealth, a spokesman said. In 2008, Prawit declared assets of 57 million baht. In his 2014 declaration, his assets had risen to 87 million baht.

Personal life 
Prawit is single. He enjoys jogging and playing golf in his free time. He is not known to speak, read, or write any language other than Central Thai.

Education 
 Armed Forces Academies Preparatory School (AFAPS), 1965
 Chulachomklao Royal Military Academy (CRMA), 1969
 Command and General Staff College (CGSC), 1978
 National Defense College (NDC), 1997

Ranks
 2nd Infantry Division Queen's Guard, Commanding General, 1996
 1st  Corps Commander, 1998
 1st  Army Area Commander, 2002
 Commander in Chief, RTA, 2004
 Chairman of the Committee on Independent Body Affairs Groups

Honours 
:
 2003 -  Knight Grand Cordon (Special Class) of the Most Exalted Order of the White Elephant
 2000 -  Knight Grand Cordon (Special Class) of the Most Noble Order of the Crown of Thailand
 2005 -  Grand Companion (Third Grade) of the Most Illustrious Order of Chula Chom Klao
 1973 -  Recipient of the Vietnam War Victory Medal with flames
 1982 -  Recipient of the Freemen Safeguarding Medal (First Class)
 1974 -  Recipient of the Border Service Medal
 1983 -  Recipient of the Chakra Mala Medal
 2008 -  First Class of Boy Scout Citation Medal of Vajira
 ??? -  First Class (Gold Medal) of the Red Cross Medal of Appreciation

Foreign Honour 

  :

??? -  Pingat Jasa Gemilang (Tentera)
  :

??? -  Army Commendation Medal

  :

??? -  Vietnam Campaign Medal

See also
 Rajabhakti Park#Prawit Wongsuwan

References 

|-

|-

|-

1945 births
Living people
Prawit Wongsuwon
Prawit Wongsuwon
Prawit Wongsuwon
Prawit Wongsuwon
Prawit Wongsuwon
Prawit Wongsuwon
Prawit Wongsuwon
Prawit Wongsuwon
Prawit Wongsuwon
Prawit Wongsuwon
Prawit Wongsuwon
Prawit Wongsuwon
Prawit Wongsuwon